Frederick "Freddie" McClair is a fictional character from the British television series Skins. He is portrayed by Luke Pasqualino. In the third series, he is involved in a love triangle with Effy Stonem and his best friend James Cook. This causes a conflict between him and Cook, as well as their other best friend JJ. In the fourth series he continues his relationship with Effy and attempts to help her through her depression.

Characterisation
Freddie is best described as a laidback and sensible character who enjoys skateboarding and smoking cannabis. His best friends are Cook and JJ; they call themselves "The Three Musketeers" because of their close friendship. Freddie cares deeply for both his friends, most of the time helping JJ through his social problems because of his Asperger syndrome and attempts to control Cook's wild, if often uncontrollable behaviour with varying degrees of success.

Despite his friendly nature, his home life is particularly difficult as he doesn't get along well with his father and sister. He dislikes how his sister, Karen McClair uses her mother's death as leverage to win sympathy and popularity in a talent competition. His relationship with his father is also poor, as he believes Karen gets preferential treatment over him. By the fourth series, Freddie significantly matures and he becomes closer with his family as well as Karen, having resolved their differences, although it is revealed in his central episode that his mother took her own life, making him paranoid that Effy will do the same.

Freddie is portrayed as a sensitive character that falls in love with Effy Stonem. In series three his friendship with Cook deteriorates. Cook's wild image has become unbearable and exacerbates Freddie's concern for him as well as Cook eventually sleeping with Effy and boasting about it to Freddie. However Effy chooses Freddie in the series finale and Freddie is willing to reconcile with Cook, showing his capacity for forgiveness.

Starting from the second episode in series 4, Freddie is in a relationship with Effy, which becomes troubled when the latter develops psychotic depression. In the penultimate episode of the series, Freddie is murdered by Effy's psychiatrist Dr. Foster, and the last episode's main plot sees the gang investigate Freddie's disappearance. His death was foreshadowed multiple times in series 3, such as when he asked Cook "Do you want to die?" in the latter's central episode when criticising his reckless behaviour, and during his own central episode when Naomi tells the story of Hamlet while looking at him, finishing with "somebody has to kill him".

Character history

Series 3
In “Everyone”, Freddie starts his first day at college and is smitten by Effy and consequently competes for her attention against his best friends Cook and JJ. Effy proposes whoever breaks the college rules first gets to have sex with her, which Cook completes. In “Cook”, Freddie gets a call from Karen interrupting Cook's birthday outing only to discover she wants drugs. Freddie discovers she's at an engagement party and the gang go there only for Cook to cause trouble. Freddie admits he cannot take care of him anymore although Cook reconciles with him at the episode's end.

In “Freddie”, he watches Karen reach the final of a talent show but is disgusted at how she uses their mother's death to further her progress in a singing competition, and is implicitly uncomfortable with the sexual presentation of his sister, which is only aggravated by Cook's comments. At home Effy arrives and talks to Freddie in his shed whilst smoking weed. However Cook and JJ arrive only for Cook to demand Effy leave after she turns down his offer of sex. Later Freddie returns her bracelet and hints at a relationship but she rebuffs him, stating that she would “break his heart”. As Karen begins to further her progress in the singing competition, Freddie gets increasingly annoyed with how things are turning out - from his father converting his shed into a dance studio for Karen to forcing Freddie into supporting his sister during a televised interview, which he ruins. To calm himself down, Freddie opts to meet up with Cook and JJ at a pub, where JJ inadvertently reveals that Cook had sex with Karen, angering Freddie. Later in the episode, Freddie seeks out Effy at a park where they share a passionate kiss in the water. He confesses he loves her. After a confrontation with his father and Karen, and feeling that his father has a point, he eventually offers Karen his support through the competition finale. After Karen loses the competition by 15 votes, Cook, without any hesitation, admits that he got his uncle's pub to vote entirely against Karen as revenge for stealing the shed, infuriating Freddie to the point where he even attacks Cook, ending their friendship. Nonetheless, the end of the episode shows Cook around Effy's where Freddie sees them in her bedroom window. Effy appears emotionless as Freddie walks away.

In “JJ”, JJ is motivated by Emily to confront Freddie about the ruination of their once-strong friendship with Cook. There, he discovers that Freddie has developed a relationship with Katie Fitch, Emily's twin sister, and inadvertently reveals Emily's homosexuality to her. In the ensuing meeting he has with JJ, Freddie informs him that he must choose between him or Cook, which upsets JJ. It is also revealed that Freddie has his shed back after the events of his central episode. Cook later takes some of JJ's prescription medication which compels him to tell the truth. After seeing Cook getting attacked, Freddie berates JJ for being careless, though the two eventually manage to rescue Cook. Cook groggily admits to Freddie that he loves Effy, and that Freddie discovers Effy does not love Cook back which gives him some hope.

In “Effy”, Freddie is continuing his relationship with Katie Fitch to Effy's dismay. At a camping trip most of the gang attend, Freddie grows distant from Katie, flirting with Effy after her apparent rejection of Cook. Katie confronts Effy's behaviour but because of Effy's consumption of magic mushrooms (and subsequent bad trip), she knocks Katie out with a rock after she was pushed and pinned to the ground. Effy wanders back to the camp-site; she is too scared to tell the others of Katie and proceeds to have sex with Freddie. Katie is eventually found and taken to hospital where she reveals Effy hit and left her (although conveniently left out the reasons why she did so). Nonetheless this disgusts Freddie and a disgraced Effy leaves Bristol with Cook.

In “Katie and Emily”, Freddie and JJ run into the Fitch twins at a clothes shop. Freddie talks to Katie and apologises for his behaviour at the camp-site, Katie forces Freddie to take her to the prom and volunteers Emily to go with JJ. Freddie jokes that JJ would love to go with Emily after the two had sex. This causes problems for the Fitches and Emily's relationship with Naomi.

In the series finale, Freddie gets a call from Effy, who states her concern for Cook and how his father manipulates him. She tells Freddie where they are, who takes JJ with him and travels there. The town host an annual race which the boys enter, stating the winner takes Effy. JJ surprisingly wins the race using his intelligence and uses the occasion to take charge and demand Effy picks one of them. Whilst she does not say anything, her gaze lingers at Freddie which angers Cook, who leaves. Cook gets in an argument with his dad, who threatens to burn Cook's face off. Freddie arrives to knock Cook Senior out, helping his friend. The four travel back to Bristol, where the problem seemingly remains unsolved despite Freddie temporarily patching up his differences with Cook.

Series 4
In “Thomas”, the suicide of Sophia plunges the gang into mistrust. However Freddie is not affected by this, he is dwelling on Effy's refusal to come back to college, and has been out of contact with her for some time.

In “Emily”, Effy returns to college and speaks to Freddie. They discuss where Effy had been before she leaves, stating she missed Freddie the most. Freddie is doubtful when he sees her hugging Cook. When Emily questions Freddie whether he can trust her, he fails to answer. Later at a house party, Freddie and Effy kiss making a watchful Cook lash out at a fellow party-goer out of rage and jealousy. They promptly leave.

In “Cook” it is revealed that Cook's mother, Ruth, had given Freddie a blowjob at Cook's 15th birthday party. Freddie reveals this when he goes to see Cook having been concerned about his recent behaviour, and feeling sorrow for Cook being expelled from college. After Cook is arrested, Effy visits him in prison and informs him that she loves Freddie. On the date of his hearing, Freddie, Effy and JJ visit him and await the trial conclusion only to discover Cook is being held in custody.

In “Freddie”, Effy and Freddie live a hedonistic lifestyle away from their family. Freddie's education and interaction with his other friends suffer as a result. He is persuaded to see a school counselor, which proves ineffective. However, Freddie notices Effy's psychotic tendencies and after a talk with his grandfather Norman, Freddie is motivated to look after her and not make the mistakes his father did with Freddie's deceased mother. A trip outside with Effy starts well but eventually Effy is scared and loses Freddie in a street parade. Surprisingly it is Katie, part of the parade, who notices Effy and despite their past, she helps Effy find Freddie. They take Effy to Norman's but after being left alone, Effy attempts suicide by slitting her wrists, only for Freddie to find her and take her to hospital. There, he meets Anthea (Morwenna Banks), Effy's mother, and tells her Effy needs her mother, not him. Cook, now escaped from custody, convinces Freddie not to give up on Effy.

In “Effy”, Effy returns home from hospital with a new schedule and a new reserved personality. She visits Freddie and they talk about her psychiatrist Dr. Foster (Hugo Speer) who has removed Effy's bad memories and forbids Effy from seeing Freddie as part of the treatment. Freddie is understandably upset Effy had bad memories of him. Later the gang announce their A-Level results. Freddie attains 2 Cs and an A, grades that are slightly better than Katie's and Emily's. Effy declares the results are unimportant to her and leaves. When Freddie next sees her and they argue, Effy's personality changes as Dr. Foster's psychological work makes her forget everyone she has loved. However, after she talks with Cook (who saves her life in the process) she realises who she is and goes to Freddie and tells him to tell Dr. Foster to leave her alone. Freddie orders Dr. Foster to leave Effy and subsequently stays with Effy for the night and she tells him “I love you” several times and he cries and says “I love you too so so much and I will see you in the morning”. This is the last time she sees Freddie. Freddie receives a phone call from Dr. Foster and as a result he goes to confront the doctor personally. Freddie does not tell anyone about his decision. When he reaches Dr. Foster's house, he demands that Foster leaves Effy alone. The doctor admits to him that getting too personal with Effy was a mistake. However, when Freddie attempts to leave he finds the door is locked. Dr. Foster approaches him and informs Freddie that Effy means much more to him, and says that "she really loves [him]" and "that's why [he] can't let [him] go". Dr. Foster then proceeds to brutally murder Freddie with a baseball bat out of view.

In the series finale, Cook discovers Freddie's concern about Dr. Foster and follows the doctor back to his house. Cook breaks into John Foster's basement where he finds Freddie's blood stained clothes and shoes. Cook then seemingly hears Freddie's ghostly voice warning him to leave before Foster comes, this spooks Cook and he turns on a light just before Foster arrives with his baseball bat. John hits him in the stomach almost knocking him to the ground with his bat and verbally taunts him. Cook gets up laughing and admits he is a "waste of space" and a criminal, but then he tells John that he knows he killed Freddie. He then gets angry and holds his fist up ready to beat him and screams out "I'm Cook!" and launches himself at John as the season ends. As it is later revealed in Series 7, Cook killed Foster avenging Freddie’s death.

External links
Freddie McClair on the official E4 Skins site
Freddie McClair Character Blog on E4 Skins site
 Freddie McClair on Myspace

Skins (British TV series) characters
Fictional ghosts
Fictional English people
Television characters introduced in 2009
Fictional murdered people
Fictional cannabis users
Teenage characters in television
Male characters in television
British male characters in television